J.L. Odea (born 1884) was a male doubles tennis player.

Odea was the men's doubles champion runner-up at the inaugural Australasian Championships in 1910 with Rodney Heath.

Grand Slam Titles
Doubles:
 Australian Open Runner-up: 1910 with Rodney Heath

References

1884 births
Year of death missing
Australian male tennis players
Place of birth missing